Du Xian (born 23 September 1954) is a Chinese news anchor, journalist, and professor.

Biography
Du was born in Beijing in 1954, the daughter of the scientist and engineer Du Qinghua, an academician the Chinese Academy of Engineering.

After graduating from Communication University of China in 1982 she was assigned to China Central Television to host Xinwen Lianbo.

On June 4, 1989, Zhang Hongmin and Du Xian reported the People's Liberation Army cleared out thousands of protest students in Tian'anmen Square protests of 1989, she was forced to resign for expressing sympathy (she wore a black mourning gown and her voice was deeply different from usual).

In January 2000, Du was employed as a host at Phoenix Television, she hosted We Only Have One Earth, Crossing the Sand Line, and Looking for the Faraway Homeland.

She is now a professor at Communication University of China.

Works

Television
 Xinwen Lianbo
 We Only Have One Earth
 Crossing the Sand Line
 Looking for the Faraway Homeland

Book
 My 106 days in America

Personal life
Du was married to a notable Chinese actor Chen Daoming, their daughter, Chen Ge, was born in 1985.

References

1954 births
Living people
CCTV newsreaders and journalists
Chinese women journalists
Communication University of China alumni
Academic staff of the Communication University of China
Educators from Beijing